EXD may refer to:
 Book of Exodus, of the Torah
 DHS Explosives Division, of the United States Department of Homeland Security
 Employee experience design
 Excited delirium, medical condition
 Exeter St Davids railway station, in England
 French abbreviation for Far-right politicians not in a particular party